Paris in Spring (also released as Paris Love Song) is a 1935 black and white musical comedy film directed by Lewis Milestone for Paramount Pictures. It is based on a play by Dwight Taylor, with a screen play by Samuel Hoffenstein and Franz Schulz.

Plot
Afraid of marriage, Simone (Mary Ellis) ends her long term engagement with her fiancé Paul de Lille (Tullio Carminati). Paul heads to the top of The Eiffel Tower with thoughts of suicide. In another part of Paris, and also afraid of marriage, Mignon (Ida Lupino) decides to separate from her young lover (James Blakely). Despairing, Mignon also climbs to the top of The Eiffel Tower intending to leap to her death. There she meets Paul and the two compare stories. After discussion, Paul dissuades her from leaping and the two conspire to make their respective partners jealous by pretending to have an affair with each other.

Partial cast
 Mary Ellis as Simone
 Tullio Carminati as Paul de Lille
 Ida Lupino as Mignon de Charelle
 Lynne Overman as DuPont
 Jessie Ralph as Grandma Leger
 Dorothea Wolbert as Francine
 Akim Tamiroff as Cafe Manager
 Jack Raymond as Elevator Man
 Arnold Korff as Doctor
 Rolfe Sedan as Modiste
 Arthur Housman as Interviewer
 Jack Mulhall as George, Cafe Simone Doorman
 Elsa Peterson as Hairdresser
 Michael Mark as Bartender
 Billy Gilbert as First Chef
 William Irving as Second Chef
 Francis Ford as Drunken Peasant
 James Blakeley as Albert de Charelle
 Craig Reynolds as Alphonse
 Joseph North as Etienne
 Harold Entwistle as Charles The Butler
 Sam Ash as Clerk

Soundtrack
 "Paris in Spring" by Harry Revel and Mack Gordon, sung by Mary Ellis and Tullio Carminati
 "Jealousy", sung by Mary Ellis
 "Bonjour et Bonsoir", sung by Mary Ellis and Tullio Carminati

Reception and release
The film was first released in US theaters on 28 May 1935. The New York Times reviewer wrote that while Mary Ellis offered a degree of entertainment with her singing, Tullio Carminati did not help the film by treating the film in a burlesque style. The newspaper was of the opinion Ida Lupino and James Blakeley were moderately good in their roles, but any merited praise for acting was to the credit of Lynne Overman, Jessie Ralph, and to the actor in the lesser role of the Chez Simone manager.

Reviewer Graham Greene praised Milestone's emulation of Ernst Lubitsch in his ability to create a film that was a "silly, charming tale", and make something "light, enchanting, and genuinely fantastic" out of a nonsense plot device. Lupino's role in Paris in Spring has been described as "dull", a view she shared.

References

External links
 Paris in Spring at Allmovie
 Paris in Spring at the Internet Movie Database
 Film Poster

1935 films
Paramount Pictures films
1935 romantic comedy films
American romantic comedy films
American black-and-white films
Films directed by Lewis Milestone
Films set in Paris
Films with screenplays by Franz Schulz
1930s English-language films
1930s American films